Philipp Fürst (8 November 1936 – 6 November 2014) was a German gymnast who competed in the 1960 Summer Olympics and in the 1964 Summer Olympics. He was born in Ludwigshafen-Oppau.

References

1936 births
2014 deaths
German male artistic gymnasts
Olympic gymnasts of the United Team of Germany
Gymnasts at the 1960 Summer Olympics
Gymnasts at the 1964 Summer Olympics
Olympic bronze medalists for the United Team of Germany
Olympic medalists in gymnastics
Medalists at the 1964 Summer Olympics
20th-century German people
21st-century German people